Stephen Brendan Lennon (born 25 November 1993) is an Irish professional darts player who plays in events of the Professional Darts Corporation (PDC).

Career
Lennon played county darts for Kilkenny and Kildare. Lennon has played professional darts since 2011. He first won a tournament in the Ireland Players Championship, beating Stephen Byrne 6–1 in the Final. In 2016, he made it to the Final of Finnish Masters, beating Dennis Nilsson.

Lennon entered the Professional Darts Corporation's Qualifying School in 2017, and picked up a Tour Card on the third day.

He made his World Championship debut in 2018 but lost 2–3 to Michael Smith in the first round.

Lennon made it to the final of the 2018 Dutch Darts Masters, where he lost out to Michael van Gerwen. He reached the quarter-final of the 2018 Players Championship Finals, again losing to van Gerwen.

Following Gary Anderson's withdrawal from the 2019 Premier League, Lennon was selected as one of nine 'contenders' to replace him. He played Peter Wright on Night 3, in Dublin. Lennon took a 3–0 lead, only to lose 7–5.

In June 2019, Lennon alongside William O'Connor made it all the way to the final of the 2019 PDC World Cup of Darts where they eventually lost to Scotland 3-1.

He enjoyed one of his finest days in the PDC on 22 February 2020 when he got to the semi-finals of Players Championship 5, only to lose narrowly to Gerwyn Price. Lennon had three averages of over 100. He hit his first PDC nine-dart finish in his last 32 game against Kai Fan Leung.

World Championship results

PDC
2018: First round (lost to Michael Smith 2–3)
2019: Second round (lost to Alan Norris 2–3)
2020: First round (lost to Callan Rydz 2–3)
2021: Second round (lost to Devon Petersen 1–3)
2022: Third round (lost to Mervyn King 0–4)

Career finals

PDC team finals: 1 (1 runner-up)

Performance timeline

PDC European Tour

References

External links
 

1993 births
Irish darts players
Living people
British Darts Organisation players
Professional Darts Corporation current tour card holders
PDC World Cup of Darts Irish team
People from County Carlow